Hardwar may refer to:

Hardwar, usually spelled Haridwar, a city in the Haridwar district, Uttarakhand state, India. Most importantly, Hardwar may be broken into 'Har', which is representative of the devotion of Lord Shiva's disciples
Hardwar district, also spelled Haridwar district, a district in the Uttarakhand state, India
Hardwar (video game), a 1998 trading and flight simulator
Hardwar Gap, a gap in the Blue Mountains, Jamaica